The 2002 South Tyneside Metropolitan Borough Council election took place on 2 May 2002 to elect members of South Tyneside Metropolitan Borough Council in Tyne and Wear, England. One third of the council was up for election and the Labour Party kept overall control of the council.

After the election, the composition of the council was:
Labour 50
Liberal Democrat 6
Others 4

Campaign
20 seats were contested in the election with 6 Progressives and 3 independents standing in addition to 20 Labour, 17 Liberal Democrat and 12 Conservative candidates. Meanwhile, 3 sitting Labour councillors stood down at the election, Cathy Brown, Alex Tudberry and Ed Malcolm.

The election saw all postal voting in an attempt to increase voter turnout, along with a trial of an electronic counting system. Postal voting was successful in increasing turnout with over half of voters taking part, at 55% turnout had increased significantly on the 27% seen in the previous election in 2000.

Election result
The results saw Labour maintain their majority on the council after not losing any seats in the election. Labour held all 3 seats that had been seen as key wards, Beacon and Bent, Westoe and Whiteleas, while the Liberal Democrat leader on the council, Jim Selby, was re-elected in Cleadon and East Boldon.

Ward results

References

2002
2002 English local elections
21st century in Tyne and Wear